The 8th Parliament of Upper Canada was opened 31 January 1821.  Elections in Upper Canada had been held in July 1820.  All sessions were held at York, Upper Canada and sat in the second Parliament Buildings of Upper Canada.  This parliament was dissolved 22 June 1824.

The House of Assembly of the 8th Parliament of Upper Canada had four sessions 31 January 1821 to 19 January 1824: It sat at the second Parliament Buildings of Upper Canada until a fire destroyed it and moved to the York General Hospital.

This parliament saw the emergence of the power and conservative Family Compact with member Sir John Robinson, 1st Baronet, of Toronto.

See also
Legislative Council of Upper Canada
Executive Council of Upper Canada
Legislative Assembly of Upper Canada
Lieutenant Governors of Upper Canada, 1791-1841
Historical federal electoral districts of Canada
List of Ontario provincial electoral districts

References

Further reading 
Handbook of Upper Canadian Chronology, Frederick H. Armstrong, Toronto : Dundurn Press, 1985. 

08
1821 establishments in Upper Canada
1824 disestablishments in Upper Canada